Rohožník may refer to:

 Rohožník, Humenné District, Slovakia
 Rohožník, Malacky District, Slovakia